Kamari is a coastal village on the southeastern part of the Aegean island of Santorini, Greece, in the Cyclades archipelago with a population of approx. 1800 according to the 2001 census. It is part of the
Municipality of Thira and is situated approximately 8 km away from the island's capital Fira. Kamari was built by residents of the nearby village of Episkopi Gonias, which was almost flattened by a devastating earthquake that hit Santorini in July 1956. 

The village got its name from a small arch (Kamara) that still rises at the south end of its beach and is what remains from an ancient sanctuary dedicated to Poseidon. Today, it stretches along a beach covered with black pebbles,
which is the longest of the island. The beach extends in a northeast to southwest direction from Monolithos to the feet of the Mesa vouno mountain that rises up to a height of approx. 400m, being Santorini's second highest peak. Once an agricultural and fishing village, modern Kamari boasts a thriving tourist industry, offering a wide choice of accommodation, restaurants, cafes, bars and night clubs, plus several water sport activities.

In 2002, an archaic sanctuary dedicated to Achilles was discovered in Kamari.

See also
Episkopi Gonias
Ancient Thera
Sellada

External links

Kamari.gr

Santorini
Populated places in Thira (regional unit)